The Republic of India shares borders with several sovereign countries; it shares land borders with China, Bhutan, Nepal, Pakistan, Afghanistan, Bangladesh and Myanmar. Bangladesh and Pakistan share both land borders as well as maritime borders, while Sri Lanka shares only a maritime border through Ram Setu. India's Andaman and Nicobar Islands share a maritime border with Thailand, Myanmar and Indonesia.

Land borders of India

India shares land borders with seven sovereign nations. The state's Ministry of Home Affairs also recognizes a  land border with an eighth nation, Afghanistan, as part of its claim of the Kashmir region (see Durand Line).

Maritime borders of India 

Maritime borders of India are the maritime boundary recognized by the United Nations Convention on the Law of the Sea entails boundaries of territorial waters, contiguous zones, and exclusive economic zones. India, with its claim of a  territorial maritime zone and  exclusive economic zone, has a more than  maritime border shared with seven nations.

Border ceremonies 

India co-hosts the joint ceremonies with the neighbouring nations at the following border crossings. The most attended and emotionally-charged among these is the one at Wagha-Attari Border near Amritsar-Lahore.

India-Pakistan border 

At the following border crossing sites the beating retreat flag ceremonies are jointly held by the military of both nations every day at 6 pm, which are open to the public as tourist attractions. No special permit or ticket is needed. From north to south, the ceremony sites are as follows:

 Attari–Wagah border ceremony near Amritsar in Punjab.
 Ganda Singh Wala–Hussainiwala border ceremony near Firozepur in Punjab.
 Sadqi-Sulemanki border ceremony near Fazilka in Punjab.
 Khokhrapar–Munabao border ceremony in Barmer district of Rajasthan.

India-China border

India and China have five Border Personnel Meeting point (BPM points) where they hold the flag meeting to discuss the military matters as well as the ceremonial BPMs for cultural exchange to improve bilateral relations by celebrating New Year's Day (January 1), India's Republic Day (January 26), Harvest Festival (April 14), May 15 PLA Day and Indian Independence Day (August 15). These meetings include the playing of each country's national anthem and saluting of their respective flags, and ceremonial addresses by representative of both armies. On Indian side only Indian citizens are allowed to visit only 2 passes out of these several BPM passes/sites, Bum La Pass and Nathu La, only on Wednesdays, Thursdays, Saturdays, and Sundays, only after obtaining Inner Line Permit (ILP) one day in advance.

These BPM passes and border posts where these meetings are held, from west to east, are as follows:

 DBO
 Spanggur Gap (Chushul)
 Nathu La: The pass is used for pilgrims to monasteries in Sikkim such as Rumtek, one of the holiest shrines in Buddhism. For Hindus, the pass reduces the journey time to Lake Manasarovar from fifteen days to two days.
 Bum La Pass (Tawang): on Sundays and during cultural ceremonies. 
 Kaho, India (north of Kibithu in Walong sector).

India-Bangladesh border

Benapole–Petrapole border ceremony, a similar but much friendlier ceremony than Indo-Pak Attari-Wagah ceremony, is held daily jointly by India's Border Security Force and Border Guards Bangladesh at India-Bangladesh border from 4.30 to 5 pm. It is open to civilians without any ticket or special permit. The Benapole–Petrapole joint retreat ceremony results in lowering of national flags of India and Bangladesh.

Designated crossings with ICP & LCS 

The map of ICP and LCS.

Integrated Check Posts (ICP) 

Oct 2017). Designated Integrated Check Posts (ICP), with both customs and immigration facilities are:

India–Bangladesh border

 Assam
 Karimganj-Golapganj uppozilla in Sylhet District of Bangladesh via Sutarkandi integrated checkpost crossing on NH37(India) and Sheola post (Sylhet division, Bangladesh), plan announced c. Oct 2017.

 Meghalaya
 Shillong-Sylhet via Dawki ICP integrated checkpost crossing (Jaintia Hills, India) and Tambil post (Bangladesh). Dawki ICP foundation stone laid in January 2017 and is in operation from 2018.

 Mizoram
 Kawrpuichhuah - official spelling (also spelled as Kawarpuchiah or Kawripuichhuah) - near Tlabung in Lunglei district, opened in Oct 2017. The 22 km long Lunglei–Tlabung–Kawrpuichhuah road was upgraded in 2014–2015 in a World Bank-funded project to enhance India-Bangladesh border connectivity. It is located on Khawthalangtuipui river (Karnaphuli)

 Tripura
 Agartala-Dhaka via Agartala integrated checkpost (India) and Akhaura checkpost crossing, already functional (c. 2017).

 "Belonia, India - Parshuram, Bangladesh road and rail crossing checkposts" in South Tripura district which connect the railway from Santirbazar in India to Feni in Bangladesh.

 West Bengal (clockwise from Kolkata to north)
Kolkata–Dhaka via Petrapole integrated checkpost crossing, already functional (c. 2017).

 Barasat (India) to Ghojadanga (Bangladesh), plan announced c. Oct 2017.

 Mahadipur in Malda district in Malda-Rajshahi via Mahadipur crossing, in-principal approval in 2019.

 Fulbari, plan announced c. Oct 2017.

 Hili, plan announced c. Oct 2017.
 Changrabandha railway station, in-principal approval in 2019.

India–Bhutan border

 Jaigaon at Alipurduar district of West Bengal, plan approved c. 2016.

India–Myanmar border

 Moreh ICP, already operational.

 Zochawchhuah (Lawngtlai district in India) - Zorinpui (Myanmar) at Indo-Myanmar border on Kaladan Multi-Modal Transit Transport Project has already been operational since Oct 2017. Survey for the Rail line from Sairang to Hmawngbuchhuah (1 km north of Zochawchhuah) was completed in August 2017 and it will be constructed in future phase.

India–Nepal border

 Banbasa in Champawat district of Uttarakhand, in-principle approval in 2019.

 Bhitthamore in Sitamarhi district of Bihar, in-principle approval in 2019.

 Jogbani, Bihar

 Panitanki, Darjeeling district of West Bengal, in-principal approval in 2019.

 Raxaul, Bihar

 Sonauli, Uttar Pradesh.

 Rupaidiha, Uttar Pradesh

 Taulihawa-Siddharthnagar, Uttar Pradesh

India–Pakistan border

 Attari at Wagah in Punjab, already operational (2017) (see Samjhauta Express).

Kartarpur Corridor, a border crossing for Indian citizens, only, to be able to visit Gurdwara Darbar Sahib, from Dera Baba Nanak, visa-free.

 Munabao in Barmer district in Rajasthan (see Thar Express)

Land Customs Stations (LCS)

India–Bangladesh border
Designated Land Customs Stations (LCS) are (no immigration facilities):

 Assam
 Mankachar Land Customs Stations (India) - Rowmari post (Natun Bandar, Rangpur division, Bangladesh)
 Karimganj Steamer and Ferry Station (KSFS) (India) - Zakiganj post (Sylhet division, Bangladesh)
 Guwahati Steamer Ghat (Dhubri district, India) -
 Dhubri Steamer Ghat (Dhubri district, India) - Rowmati (Maymansingh division, Bangladesh)
 Assam non-functional LCS are:
 Mahisasan railway station (Karimganj district, India) - Shahbazpur (Sylhet division)
 Golokganj (Dhubri district) - Sonahaat (Rangpur Division)
 Silchar Railway Mail Service (India) - independent of border (no border, inland LCS)

 West Bengal

 Meghalaya
 Baghmara (South Garo Hills, India) - Bijoyour post (Bangladesh)
 Bholaganj (East Khasi Hills district) - Chatak (Sunamganj division)
 Borsara Land Customs Stations (West Khasi Hills, India) - Borsara post (Bangladesh)
 West Garo Hills - Bakshiganj via Mahendraganj crossing on NH12 
 Tura-Nalitabari via Dalu crossing on NH217 (West Garo Hills, India) and Nakugaon post (Bangladesh)
 Shellabazar (West Khasi Hills district) - Sunamganj(Sylhet division)
 Gasuapara (South Garo Hills district)- Karoitol (Mymansing division)
 Meghalaya non-functional LCS are:
 Ryngku (East Khasi Hills district) - Kalibari (Sonamganj division)
 Balat (East Khasi Hills district) - Dolura (Sylhet division)

 Tripura
 Srimantapur (Sipahijala district) - Bibir Bazar (Comilla division), became operational in January 2016. 
 Dhalaighat (Dhalai district) - Kumarghat (Sunamganj division) 
 Khowaighat (West Tripura district) - Balla (Habiganj division)
 Manu (Dhalai district) - Chatlapur (Sylhet division )
 Muhurighat (South Tripura district) -  Belonia (Feni division )
 Old Ragnabazar (North Tripura district) - Betul (Fultali) (Sylhet division)

 Mizoram
 Kawarpuchiah integrated checkpost, opened in Oct 2017 by Prime Minister Narendra Modi.
 Non-functional LCS in Mizoram:
 Demagiri (Lunglei district) - Rangamati (Sylhet division)

India–Pakistan border

 Longewala in Jaisalmer district of Rajsthan

Border bazaars and haats

This proposed list of border bazaars and haats is in varying stages of implementation, as suggested by State Governments to the Ministry of External Affairs for setting up Border Haats.

India–Bangladesh

India–Bangladesh border Haats areasfollows.

 Meghalaya
 Balat in West Khasi Hills district
 Bholaganj
 Kalaichar in West Khasi Hills district
 Nalikata
 Ryngku
 Shibbari
 Mizoram
 Mamit district
 Mapara - Longkor 	 
 Tuipuibari - Not provided
 Lunglei district
 Silsury - Mahmuam
 Nunsuri - Not provided
 Tripura: Decision on Tripura Haats will be subsequent to the completion of agreement w.r.t. Meghalaya Haats.
  West Tripura district
 Kamalasagar
 Boxanagar
 Bamutia
 South Tripura district
 Srinagar, Tripura
 Ekimpur
 North Tripura district
 Pal Basti (Raghna), 
 Hiracherra (Kailasahar)
 Kamalpur, Tripura (Dhalai)

India-Bhutan 

India-Bhutan Border Haat on India-Bhutan border are in operation.

India–Myanmar

India–Myanmar border Haats are.

 Arunachal Pradesh Border Haats
 Changlang district
 Pangsau Pass (Nampong), - Pangsau, Kachin State
 Chingsa (Khimiyang Circle) - Langhong, Kachin State
 Makantong (Khimiyang Circle) - Ngaimong, Kachin State

 Tirap district
 Wakka/Pongchao/Lazu - Tirap, Kachin State.

 Manipur Border Haats
 Ukhrul district
 Kongkan Thana - Aungci, suggested by State Government.

 Chandel district
 New Somtal - Thenjen, or Khampat

 Churachandpur district
 Behiang  - Khenman, or Chikha.

 Mizoram Border Haats
 Lawngtlai district
 Hruitezawl, Lawngtlai district - Varang.

 Champhai district
 Hnahlan - Darkhai
 Vaphai - Leilet

 Saiha district - Nviaphia
 Chakhang, Saiha district - Nviaphia.

 Nagaland Border Haats
 Tuensang district
 Avakhung - Layshi are 32 km from each other.
 Pangsha - Lahe/Hkamti District HQ are 60 km from each other.

 Mon district 
 Chemoho/Longwa - Lahe are 60 km from each other.

 Phek district
 Molhe - Pansat are 10 km from each other.

In popular media 

Pradeep Damodaran's book "Borderlands: travels across India's boundaries" chronicles all land borders of India. The bollywood director J. P. Dutta has specialised in making Hindi movies with India's border as key element of the theme, his movies are Border (1997 film), Refugee (2000 film), LOC: Kargil, Paltan (film), etc.

See also 

 India related
 Climate of India
 Disputed territories of India 
 Exclusive economic zone of India
 Extreme points of India
 Geography of India
 Look East policy
 Look-East connectivity
 Northeast India connectivity projects

 General
 How different scales of measurement impacts the length of land border

 Lists
 List of countries and territories by land borders
 List of countries and territories by land and maritime borders
 List of countries and territories by maritime boundaries
 List of countries that border only one other country
 List of land borders by date of establishment
 List of divided islands
 List of island nations
 List of political and geographic borders

References

Further reading

External links 
 MDoNER Northeast India and SAARC Trade Assessment report
 List of countries that have ratified Law of the Sea Conventions